Grace and Gratitude is the twenty-first studio album by Australian singer Olivia Newton-John. The album was released 25 August 2006 through EMI exclusively by Walgreens to benefit various charities of cancer and re-released on 14 September 2010 through Green Hill Records as Grace and Gratitude Renewed. A "pink" edition of the original album also was released in certain territories, with a two-track remix bonus CD.

Singles
 The album-closing track, "Instrument of Peace," was released as the album's lead single, peaking at No. 30 on the Billboard Adult Contemporary chart.
 "Help Me to Heal," was released as single in 2010, promoting the Renewed re-release.

Tours

Newton-john embarked on two tours to promote the album: a North American tour of 39 concerts, Grace and Gratitude Tour, and an Asian tour of 5 concerts, Body Heart & Spirit Tour. Her 2010 World Tour supported the re-release, Renewed.

Critical reception

Stephen Thomas Erlewine from AllMusic gave the album a positive review, although he said: "It's easy to knock this for not exactly being compelling—it glides, it doesn't grab—but that's the whole point: this is meditative mood music and it's gauzily effective in that regard in either of its incarnations".

Track listing

Renewed
The album was re-released as Grace and Gratitude Renewed on 14 September 2010, four years after the release of the original version. The new edition features new versions of tracks "To Be Wanted," "I Will Lift Up My Eyes" and "Instrument of Peace" with special guests, and also features two new tracks: "Todah" and the single "Help Me to Heal." The Japan edition also includes the two remixes from "pink" edition.

Personnel

Musicians
 Olivia Newton-John – lead vocals, backing vocals (2, 4, 6, 12, 14, 17)
 Amy Sky – keyboards (1, 3, 4, 13, 16, 17), backing vocals (2, 4, 6, 8, 10, 12, 14, 16, 17, 18), oboe (4), oboe arrangement (4, 12, 16), arrangements (11, 13, 19), cello (12, 16), string arrangements (20)
 Stephan Moccio – acoustic piano (2, 4, 6, 8, 18, 19, 20), keyboards (4, 19, 20), arrangements (19)
 Greg Johnston – transition programming, programming (2, 6, 8), string arrangements (2, 18), keyboards (5, 7, 12, 14, 15), cello arrangement (8)
 Steven MacKinnon – keyboards (9, 10), arrangements (10)
 Mike Frances – guitars (1, 3, 13), mandolin (3)
 Rob Piltch – guitars (9, 10)
 Bill Bell – guitars (16)
 George Koller – fretless bass (1, 4), sitar (2, 12, 14, 16), dilruba (5, 12, 14, 16), acoustic bass (6, 14), bass guitar (8, 12, 14, 16)
 Brian Barlow – cymbals (1, 4, 6, 14, 16, 20), vibraphone (1, 14)
 Ed Hanley – percussion (11), Standing bells (11), udu (12, 13), tabla (12, 14, 16)
 Ron Korb – Tibetan flute (1), bass flute (2), shinobue (3), Irish penny whistle (8, 17), dizi (8), Bansuri (13), low whistle (17) 
 Cynthia Steljes – oboe (4, 12, 16)
 Paul Wildner – cello (2, 4, 8, 12, 16, 17, 18, 20)
 Jon Craig – viola (2, 18)
 Benjamin Bowman – violin (2, 18, 20)
 Jayne Maddison – violin (2, 18)
 Brenna MacCremmon – backing vocals (12, 14, 16)
 Maryem Tollar – lead vocals (13)
 Marc Jordan – backing vocals (17), harmony vocals (20)

Production
 Producer – Amy Sky
 Instrumental overdubs recorded by Lorne Hounsell at Signal To Noise (Toronto, Canada).
 Lead vocals recorded by Vic Florencia, assisted by Azra Ross.
 Piano recorded by Azra Ross
 Lead vocals and piano recorded at Maison de Musique (Toronto, Canada).
 BGVs recorded by Greg Johnston
 Mixed by Vic Florencia at The Concrete Jungle (Toronto, Canada).
 Additional ProTools programming – Jeff Dalziel and Azra Ross
 Mastered by Joao Carvahlo at Joao Carvahlo Mastering (Toronto, Canada).
 Art direction – Gabrielle Raumberger
 Design – Kimyio Nishio
 Liner notes, concept and illustrations – Olivia Newton-John 
 Hand Mudrahs – Sarina Condello
 Photography – J. Michael Lafond
 Styling – Adrienne Gold
 Hair and make-up – John Sheehy
 Chart preparation – Richard Maslove

Charts

Weekly charts

Year-end charts

Release history

References

External links
 

2006 albums
Olivia Newton-John albums